Vietnam Border Guard or Vietnam Border Defence Force, formally the Vietnam Border Guard Command, is the border guard of Vietnam, being a branch of the Vietnam People's Army. It is responsible for management and protection of the sovereignty, territorial integrity, security, order and national boundaries on the mainland, islands, sea and at the gate as shall by law and is force member in provincial areas of defence, border districts of the Socialist Republic of Vietnam.

Origins
On 19 November 1958, the Politburo of the Workers Party of Vietnam decided to unite national defence forces and army units whose missions were domestic protection, border protection, beach defence, boundary security, and other forces in charge of guarding domestic international borders, under the management of the Police Department, and named them the Guard forces. Guard forces including Border Guard and Homeland Guard.

According to the resolution of the Politburo, Border Guard is responsible for:
 Repressing spies, commandos, bandits, sea pirates and small cliques participating in destructive activities in border and coastal regions;
 Attacking any army that infringes on national borders, and to cope with all activities of war while awaiting army reinforcement;
 Preventing and punishing smugglers in border areas;
 Implementing regulations on cross-border traffic promulgated by the government of Socialist Republic of Vietnam and control cross-border traffic, including cars, people, baggage, goods, works and cultural objects;
 Protecting life and property, including State property, in the border areas.

Homeland Guard is responsible for (this task transferred to police protection under the General Department of Police, Ministry of Public Security):
 Suppress all destructive activities of the small fee, parachuting spies and violence, destruction of the other counter-revolutionary cliques;
 Protect the headquarters, the leader of the Party and State, the diplomatic missions, international leaders and foreign guests visiting to Vietnam;
 Protect factories, mines, warehouses important, the centre of important contact information, clues and important transport axis, and an important transport, cultural facilities, science and Art is important;
 Protect Capital, cities and towns is important, protecting the rallies by the central government regulations, executive orders curfew as needed and the people's police to maintain order general security;
 Guarding the camps, prisons, escorting political prisoners and criminal matter, the hearing protection.

On 3 March 1959, the Prime Minister of Vietnam signed Decision No. 100 - TTg on the establishment of an armed force in charge of border protection and domestic, to be known as the People's Armed Police, set under the leadership of the Ministry of Public Security. This date is taken as the date of establishment of the Vietnam Border Guard.

Ceremony set up the People's Armed Police was held on the evening of 28 March 1959, at 19 hours, at the Military Club, Hanoi.

By the end of 1979 the People's Armed Police was renamed Border Guard and transferred under the Ministry of Defence (Vietnam). In 1988, the Border Guard moved to directly under the Ministry of Interior until late in 1995, then moved to the Ministry of Defence (Vietnam).

Mission
Border Guard is the core force in charge, in co-ordination with other armed forces, localities and departments concerned and depend on people to manage, protect borders, maintaining security political, social order and safety in the border areas, maintaining the external border. Border Guard operates under the laws of the Socialist Republic of Vietnam, the international treaties relating to the sovereignty, national security and border on the mainland, islands, seas and border gates that the Socialist Republic of Vietnam has signed or acceded to.

Structure
The organisational system of Border Guard includes three levels: Command (Central), Command provinces; Border posts.

Command of Border Guard
 General Staff
 Political Department 
 Department of Logistics
 Technology and Equipment Department
 Department of Reconnaissance
 Department of Drug Prevention
 Border Crossings Department
 Office of the Command
 21st Information Regiment
 Border Guard Academy
 Border Guard School

Border Command of the Provinces and Municipalities of Vietnam

Border posts
 Border Guard Squadrons
 Border Guard Flotillas

Ranks

Commissioned officer ranks
The rank insignia of commissioned officers.

Other ranks
The rank insignia of non-commissioned officers and enlisted personnel.

Equipment

Infantry weapons

Patrol Vessels

References

External links 
 

Border guards
B
B